Government Engineering College, Samastipur is an engineering college under Department of Science and Technology, Bihar. It is situated in Samastipur district of Bihar. College is affiliated with Aryabhatta Knowledge University. It was establishe2019.

Admission 
Admission in the college for four years Bachelor of Technology course is made through UGEAC conducted by Bihar Combined Entrance Competitive Examination Board. UGEAC is based on the rank list of JEE Main conducted by National Testing Agency.

Branches 
College offers three branches in Bachelor of Technology (B.Tech) course with annual intake of 60 students in each branch.

 B.Tech in Civil Engineering
 B.Tech in Mechanical Engineering
 B.Tech in Electrical Engineering

References

External links 

 Official website
 BCECE Board website
 Aryabhatta Knowledge University website
 DST, Bihar website

Engineering colleges in Bihar
Colleges affiliated to Aryabhatta Knowledge University
2019 establishments in Bihar
Educational institutions established in 2019